Woodstock Jazz Festival 1 is an album by pianist Chick Corea, with saxophonist Lee Konitz, or drummer Jack DeJohnette and bassist Miroslav Vitous recorded at the Woodstock Jazz Festival celebrating Creative Music Studio's 10th Anniversary in Woodstock, NY in 1981 and released on the Douglas Music label in 1997.

Critical reception 

Michael G. Nastos on Allmusic called the album "an important musical and archival document, and probably just the tip of the iceberg for what other musical magic was conjured up on that special day in the rain".

Track listing 
All compositions by Chick Corea unless noted.
 "Waltz" - 9:28
 "Isfahan" - 18:58
 "Stella by Starlight" (Victor Young, Ned Washington) - 16:04 	
 "'Round Midnight" (Thelonious Monk, Cootie Williams, Bernie Hanighen) - 8:47

Personnel 
Chick Corea – piano
Lee Konitz – alto saxophone (tracks 3 & 4)
Jack DeJohnette – drums (tracks 1 & 2)
Miroslav Vitous – bass (tracks 1 & 2)

References 

Chick Corea live albums
Lee Konitz live albums
Jack DeJohnette live albums
Miroslav Vitouš albums
1997 albums